Halsey is a city in Linn County, Oregon, United States. The population was 904 at the 2010 census.

History
The city was founded in 1872, and legally incorporated by the Oregon Legislative Assembly on October 20, 1876. The city takes its name from William L. Halsey, who was at the time vice-president of Oregon & California Railroad.

On July 31, 1903 most of the city's downtown core burned to the ground, after a fire started at the J. L. Bishur Creamery.

The city's iconic grain elevator was built in 1955  and stood at a height of 180 feet. It was partially demolished in December 2012 over concerns of structural integrity.

In 2022, the most powerful handgun cartridge in the world, the .500 Bushwhacker, was developed and introduced by Halsey residents James Tow and Keith Tow.

Geography

Demographics

2010 census
As of the census of 2010, there were 904 people, 305 households, and 244 families living in the city. The racial makeup of the city was 94.4% White, 0.3% African American, 0.6% Native American, 0.6% Asian, 0.1% Pacific Islander, 0.4% from other races, and 3.7% from two or more races. Hispanic or Latino of any race were 4.9% of the population.

There were 305 households, of which 41.0% had children under the age of 18 living with them, 64.6% were married couples living together, 8.9% had a female householder with no husband present, 6.6% had a male householder with no wife present, and 20.0% were non-families. 12.8% of all households were made up of individuals, and 3.6% had someone living alone who was 65 years of age or older. The average household size was 2.96 and the average family size was 3.24.

The median age in the city was 32.5 years. 29.8% of residents were under the age of 18; 8.5% were between the ages of 18 and 24; 29.8% were from 25 to 44; 23.6% were from 45 to 64; and 8.4% were 65 years of age or older. The gender makeup of the city was 49.8% male and 50.2% female.

2000 census
As of the census of 2000, there were 724 people, 252 households, and 199 families living in the city. The population density was 1,352.9 people per square mile (517.7/km2). There were 267 housing units at an average density of 498.9 per square mile (190.9/km2). The racial makeup of the city was 91.30% White, 0.14% African American, 1.10% Native American, 0.14% Asian, 4.83% from other races, and 2.49% from two or more races. Hispanic or Latino of any race were 5.52% of the population.

There were 252 households, out of which 38.5% had children under the age of 18 living with them, 65.5% were married couples living together, 8.3% had a female householder with no husband present, and 21.0% were non-families. 15.5% of all households were made up of individuals, and 4.8% had someone living alone who was 65 years of age or older. The average household size was 2.87 and the average family size was 3.18.

In the city, the population was spread out, with 27.9% under the age of 18, 11.7% from 18 to 24, 30.1% from 25 to 44, 22.4% from 45 to 64, and 7.9% who were 65 years of age or older. The median age was 32 years. For every 100 females, there were 115.5 males. For every 100 females age 18 and over, there were 116.6 males.

The median income for a household in the city was $45,909, and the median income for a family was $46,477. Males had a median income of $32,202 versus $18,750 for females. The per capita income for the city was $16,933. About 2.6% of families and 4.6% of the population were below the poverty line, including 3.5% of those under age 18 and none of those age 65 or over.

References

External links

Entry for Halsey in the Oregon Blue Book

Cities in Oregon
Cities in Linn County, Oregon
1872 establishments in Oregon
Populated places established in 1872